Kenny So  (Chinese: 乔星; Jyutping: Qiao Xing; original name: Su Weijian , foreign name: Kenny So, born on August 6, 1976), is a Chinese lyricist and poet best known for his songs by Nicholas Tse and Jacky Cheung. His movie theme songs received nominations at the 33rd and 34th Hong Kong Film Awards in 2014 and 2022, respectively.

Origin of pen name 
In an interview, So said that the words "Qiao"( Chinese:乔)  and "Xing" ( Chinese: 星)  were taken from the names of his two former lovers as a memorial.

Early life and education 
So was born with cerebral palsy. Having cerebral palsy impacted his control of the muscles of the whole body. During his school days, it was very difficult for So to hold a pen. Every time he did homework, he would sweat profusely and struggle with it. Despite his disability, So chose to enroll in public schools and pursue an education.  He started to write lyrics in middle school, published his adapted lyrics works online in college.  His high scores gained him entrance to Chinese University of Hong Kong, where he pursued studies in the Department of Chinese Language Literature. So graduated from the Department of Social Work of Hong Kong Polytechnic University with a certification as a social worker.

Career 
In 2005, "Bitter Lover", So's first work as a lyricist, was published. In 2007, So and Hong Kong composer Hou Guangwu participated in the CASH Pop Composition Competition, and their entry "Pink Eye Syndrome" won third place.

Since 2005, So has written song lyrics for Nicholas Tse, Jacky Cheung, Vangie Tang, Jason Chan, Elanne Kong, Ella Koon, Deep Ng, Ruco Chan, Elle Choi, Ivan Wang,Theresa Fu, Jun Kung, Eric Suen Yiu Wai, Angela Au, Sammi Chan, Terence wan, Sandy Lam and James Ng.

Work with Jacky Cheung 
In 2010, So wrote four Cantonese lyric adaptations for Jacky Cheung 's Canto-jazz album "Private Corner":  "Double Trouble", "Bu Zhi You Yuan (Lucky in Love)" (不只有缘),  "Let It Go", and "Zhao Dui Ni (Which Way, Robert Frost?)" (找对你). Double Trouble was a featured production number in Jacky Cheung's 1/2 Century Tour. "Bu Zhi You Yuan" by Jacky Cheung was the theme song of the Hong Kong film Crossing Hennessy.

Awards 

 Nomination, 33rd Hong Kong Film Awards in 2014 for "Best Original Movie Song", theme song for the movie As the Light Goes Out: Love is the Greatest.
 Nomination, 40th Hong Kong Film Awards in 2022 for "Best Original Movie Song", theme song for the movie Raging Fire:  Confrontation.

References 

1976 births
Hong Kong lyricists
Chinese male writers
Chinese poets
Chinese songwriters
Alumni of the Chinese University of Hong Kong
Alumni of the Hong Kong Polytechnic University
Hong Kong people
Living people